William Sydney Nettlefold (born 24 April 1953) is a former Australian rules footballer who played with Richmond, North Melbourne and Melbourne in the Victorian Football League (VFL).

Nettlefold spent time in most positions during his career but was used mainly as a ruck-rover. He started at Richmond before moving on to North Melbourne where he came off the bench in their victorious 1977 Grand Final. In 1980 he crossed to Melbourne and remained there for three seasons to bring his final VFL tally to exactly 100 games.

References

External links

1953 births
Living people
Richmond Football Club players
Melbourne Football Club players
North Melbourne Football Club players
North Melbourne Football Club Premiership players
People educated at St Kevin's College, Melbourne
Australian rules footballers from Victoria (Australia)
One-time VFL/AFL Premiership players